Eremophea is a genus of flowering plants belonging to the family Amaranthaceae.

Its native range is Australia.

Species:

Eremophea aggregata 
Eremophea spinosa

References

Amaranthaceae
Amaranthaceae genera